Chebi Khagan (Chinese: 車鼻可汗/车鼻可汗, Modern Chinese: (Pinyin): chēbí kěhàn, (Wade-Giles): ch'e-pi k'o-han, Middle Chinese (Guangyun) ), reconstructed Old Turkic *Çavïş; personal name Ashina Hubo (阿史那斛勃, āshǐnà húbó, a-shih-na hu-po), full regal title Yizhuchebi Khagan (乙注車鼻可汗/乙注车鼻可汗, yǐzhù chēbí kěhàn, i-chu ch'e-pi k'o-han), was a claimant of the title of khan of Eastern Turkic Khaganate after the collapse of Xueyantuo, who was successful for some time in reconstituting Eastern Turkic Khaganate, until he was defeated and captured by the Tang Dynasty general Gao Kan (高侃) in 650.

Background 
Ashina Hubo was said to be from minor branch of the Turkic imperial clan of Ashina, and his ancestors was said to have served for generations as subordinate khans to the great khans of Eastern Turkic Khaganate. His seat was near Altai mountains.

In 630, after Eastern Turkic Khaganate collapsed and the Illig Qaghan Ashina Duobi were captured by Tang Dynasty forces commanded by Li Jing, Xueyantuo, formerly an Eastern Turkic vassal, took over most of Eastern Turkic Khaganate's former lands. Some Eastern Turkic Khaganate remnants wanted to declare Ashina Hubo the khan of Eastern Turkic Khaganate, but due to Xueyantuo's strength, Ashina Hubo did not dare to declare himself khan but instead surrendered to Xueyantuo.  However, because Ashina Hubo was considered intelligent and capable, Xueyantuo was apprehensive of Ashina Hubo and wanted to kill him.  When Ashina Hubo heard this, he fled north and gathered his people, declaring himself the Yizhuchebi Khan (or Chebi Khan in short).  He made periodic pillaging attacks against Xueyantuo and gradually grew stronger.

Reign 
In 646, Tang and Huige forces destroyed Xueyantuo and Ashina Hubo grew stronger, submitting Yenisei Kyrgyz and Karluks. In 647, he sent his son Ashina Shaboluo (阿史那沙鉢羅) to China to greet Emperor Taizong of Tang and offering to visit Emperor Taizong himself. Emperor Taizong sent the generals An Diaozhe (安調遮) and Han Hua (韓華) to escort Ashina Hubo, but once they arrived at Ashina Hubo's headquarters, they realized that Ashina Hubo had no intention of visiting Chang'an, despite strong advocacy by Ashina Hubo's son Ashina Jieman (阿史那羯漫). Han conspired with Ashina Hubo's vassal tribe Karluk (葛邏祿) and their chief Nishu Kül Elteber to seize Ashina Hubo and take him back to Tang. When Ashina Hubo discovered this, Ashina Hubo's son Ashina Zhebi (阿史那陟苾) killed Han in combat, and An was also killed. Ashina Jieman, who had command of a substantial portion of Ashian Hubo's people, instead sent his own son Ashina Anshuo (阿史那菴鑠) to Tang to show submission.

Capture 
In anger, in 649 Emperor Taizong sent the general Gao Kan, supplemented by forces from Uighur (Ch. Huige) and Pugu (僕骨) tribes, made a surprise attack on Ashina Hubo.  Once Gao's forces entered Eastern Turkic territory, Eastern Turkic vassals began to surrender, as did Ashina Jieman. In 650, Gao approached Ashina Hubo's headquarters, and Ashina Hubo tried to summon the vassal tribes for aid, but drew no response. He tried to flee with his favorite concubine, but was captured by Gao. Gao took him back to Chang'an, where he was spared by Emperor Taizong's son and successor Emperor Gaozong and given a general title. His territory was divided under three Tang commandants and 24 prefectures, with various tribal chiefs as commandants and prefects. There were no further historical records about Ashina Hubo, including when he died.

Issue 

 Ashina Shaboluo (阿史那沙鉢羅)
 Ashina Jieman (阿史那羯漫)
 Ashina Anshuo (阿史那菴鑠) 
 Ashina Zhebi (阿史那陟苾)

References

Citations

Sources 

 Zizhi Tongjian, vols. 198, 199.
 Old Book of Tang, vol. 194, part 1.
 New Book of Tang, vol. 215, part 1.

Göktürk khagans
7th-century Turkic people
Monarchs taken prisoner in wartime